Bagua District is one of six districts of the province Bagua in Peru. The district was created by law on April 26, 2008.

References

2008 establishments in Peru
Districts of the Bagua Province
Districts of the Amazonas Region